Desmochloris is a genus of green algae, specifically of the Chlorocystidaceae.

References

External links

Scientific references

Scientific databases
 AlgaTerra database
 Index Nominum Genericorum

Ulvophyceae
Ulvophyceae genera